The Gwangam Tunnel (광암터널) is a road tunnel located on Hanam, Gyeonggi Province, South Korea. The tunnel constitutes the Seoul Ring Expressway.

The tunnel is constituted of 3 tunnels. 2 tunnels are to Pangyo Junction, and opened to traffic on 31 October 1991. At first, one is to Pangyo, and the other is to Guri. Each tunnels had 2 lanes. But, there was a road-widening project between Pangyo JC and Toegyewon Interchange, and the new tunnel, which has 4 lanes, opened on 10 December 2002. After opening the new tunnel, 2 tunnels, which has 2 lanes, is to Pangyo. And the new tunnel is to Guri.

See also 
 Cheonggye Tunnel: Pangyo direction, next tunnel
 Buramsan Tunnel: Guri direction, next tunnel

Road tunnels in South Korea
Buildings and structures in Hanam
Transport in Gyeonggi Province
Hanam
Tunnels completed in 1991
Tunnels completed in 2002
1991 establishments in South Korea
2002 establishments in South Korea
20th-century architecture in South Korea